Thomas McDermott (12 January 1878 – 30 June 1961) was a Scottish professional footballer who played as an inside forward.

Career
Born in Bridgeton, Glasgow, McDermott spent his early career with Cambuslang Hibernian, Dundee, Celtic (winning the British League Cup and playing on the losing side in the 1902 Scottish Cup Final), Everton of England's top division (making 29 appearances in 1904–05 as the team missed out on the Football League title by a point) and second-tier, newly-formed Chelsea.

After a second spell at Dundee (where they were Scottish Football League runners-up in 1906–07), he joined Bradford City from Hibernian in February 1908. He made 8 league appearances for the West Yorkshire club, scoring once. He left the club in November 1908 to join Gainsborough Trinity; early in the following year was he back in Scotland featuring for Kilmarnock, followed by Forfar Athletic and the newly-formed Dundee Hibernian.

He later returned to the north-west of England, playing with amateur teams Anfield Royal, St Helens Recreation (better known as a rugby league team) and Wirral Railway's works team. Back in Scotland, he then signed for Vale of Leven and Broxburn Shamrock before coming home to the Glasgow area to play for Clyde in 1913.

Sources

References

1878 births
1961 deaths
Scottish footballers
Footballers from Glasgow
People from Bridgeton, Glasgow
Cambuslang Hibernian F.C. players
Dundee F.C. players
Celtic F.C. players
Everton F.C. players
Chelsea F.C. players
Hibernian F.C. players
Bradford City A.F.C. players
Gainsborough Trinity F.C. players
Kilmarnock F.C. players
Dundee United F.C. players
Forfar Athletic F.C. players
Vale of Leven F.C. players
Clyde F.C. players
Scottish Junior Football Association players
Scottish Football League players
English Football League players
Association football inside forwards